Joseph Whiteside Coskery (22 July 1895 in County Down – 24 September 1965 in County Down) was an Irish cricketer. A left-handed batsman, he played twice for the Ireland cricket team, against Scotland and the MCC in 1924. The match against Scotland had first-class status.

References

1895 births
1965 deaths
Irish cricketers
People from Ballynahinch, County Down
Cricketers from Northern Ireland